Louis Marie Joseph Bastide (October 22, 1943 – August 29, 2010) was a Malian judge and diplomat who served as the President, or Chief Justice, of the Supreme Court of Mali.

References

1943 births
2010 deaths
Malian judges
Chief justices of Mali
Malian diplomats
People from Bamako
20th-century judges
21st-century judges
20th-century diplomats
21st-century Malian people